Johnny Kascier (born John Kacerosky; July 1, 1889May 10, 1974) was an American actor who appeared in over 90 films between 1932 and 1957.

Modern viewers will recognize Kascier as the Emir of Schmow in the Three Stooges film Malice in the Palace and its remake Rumpus in the Harem, and as the hotel bellboy who catches Moe kissing Larry's cheek in Brideless Groom. He also had an uncredited role of a courtroom spectator in Idiots Deluxe. More often than not, though, Kascier's face was rarely seen, as his primary role at Columbia Pictures was as Moe Howard's stunt double.

Kascier died on May 10, 1974.

Filmography

References

External links

1889 births
1974 deaths
American male film actors
Male actors from Minnesota
20th-century American male actors
20th-century American comedians